Raibidpura is a large village in the Nimar region of Madhya Pradesh. Located about 25 km from Khargone city, it is famed for the huge popularity of contract bridge among its populace.

References

Villages in Khargone district